Aşağıdemirci can refer to:

 Aşağıdemirci, Biga
 Aşağıdemirci, Kovancılar